Sayyid Hamoud bin Faisal al Busaidi is an Omani politician and businessman. He is the Minister of Interior in the Sultanate of Oman.

References 

Living people 
Interior ministers of Oman
Omani Muslims
Year of birth missing (living people)